Chaetorellia is a genus of tephritid  or fruit flies in the family Tephritidae.

Species
Chaetorellia acrolophi White & Marquardt, 1989
Chaetorellia ampliata Wang, 1990
Chaetorellia australis Hering, 1940
Chaetorellia carthami Stackelberg, 1929
Chaetorellia conjuncta (Becker, 1913)
Chaetorellia hestia Hering, 1937
Chaetorellia isais Hering, 1937
Chaetorellia jaceae (Robineau-Desvoidy, 1830)
Chaetorellia loricata (Rondani, 1870)
Chaetorellia succinea (Costa, 1844)

References

Tephritinae
Tephritidae genera
Taxa named by Friedrich Georg Hendel
Diptera of Europe
Diptera of Africa